Hou Yu is the name of:

Hou Yu (footballer, born 1990), Chinese footballer
Hou Yu (footballer, born 2001), Chinese footballer